Joel 2:25 International, Inc. ("Joel 2:25") is an ex-gay ministry.

Name 
Verse 2:25 from the Biblical Book of Joel states: I will restore to you the years that the swarming locust has eaten, the hopper, the destroyer, and the cutter. The great army sent among you. The organization's website states:

Formation and activities 
Joel 2:25 was incorporated in the state of Texas on November 26, 2013 as a non-profit organization. Joel 2:25 holds local in-person meetings in Dallas, Texas and other major US cities; holds daily, weekly, and monthly international video conferences; and hosts guest speakers that have included Joseph Nicolosi of the National Association for Research & Therapy of Homosexuality (NARTH) and other leaders from the Restored Hope Network, and the International Healing Foundation.

Joel 2:25 is a tax-exempt public charity and does not take positions on political parties, candidates, or issues.

Positions 
Joel 2:25 supports individual freedom of conscience for all, but believes that sexual purity is a life and death matter: "Sexual holiness for Christians matters to such an extent that living an unrepentant sexually immoral life can get even self-professed Christians excluded from the kingdom of God. (Matthew 5:29-30; John 8:11 with 5:14; 1 Thessalonians 4; Galatians 5; 1 Corinthians 5; ; 2 Corinthians 12; Romans 1; Colossians 3; Ephesians 4; 5; 1 Timothy 1.)"

Reception 
Joel 2:25 received increased media attention and scrutiny when it was revealed that the organization's founder, Jeremy Schwab, had authored the platform amendment for the 2014 Republican Party of Texas platform to protect the right of access to reparative therapy.

Schwab issued personal statements in defense of the platform plank on television and in his personal blog.

See also 
 Christianity and homosexuality
 Ex-Ex-Gay
 GLAAD
 Homophobia
 Homosexuality and Roman Catholicism
 Matthew Shepard Foundation
 Ministry to Persons with a Homosexual Inclination
 Persecution of Homosexuals in Nazi Germany
 Recovering from Religion
 Sexual orientation change efforts
 The Trevor Project

References

External links 
 

Conversion therapy organizations
Men's movement in the United States
Christian organizations established in 2013
LGBT and Christianity